Flavihumibacter solisilvae is a Gram-negative, strictly aerobic and non-motile bacterium from the genus of Flavihumibacter which has been isolated from soil from the Bac Kan Province in Vietnam.

References

Chitinophagia
Bacteria described in 2014